The Miriam Braverman Memorial Prize, named after librarian Miriam Braverman, is sponsored by the Progressive Librarians Guild (PLG). The intent of the award is "to celebrate Miriam's spirit of activism and faith in the power of people's collective social justice efforts and inspire future generations of librarians." The Prize is awarded each year for the best graduate student paper about some aspect of the social responsibilities of librarians, libraries, or librarianship. Papers related to archivists, archives, and archival work are also eligible.
 
Every winning paper is published in the Progressive Librarian journal.

Award Recipients 
2022. Daniel Clarkson Fisher. University of Western Ontario. "A Promised (but Ultimately Unreachable) Land: the Fallacy of "Political Neutrality" Exemplified by Fmr. U.S. President Barack Obama's Appearance at the 2021 ALA Annual Conference & Exhibition."
2021. Eli Holliday. University of Toronto. "Death to the Professional: Re-envisioning Labour in the Public Library" and Ashley Huot. University of Alberta. "Prison Zines: Relations, Communication, and Records."
2020. Competition cancelled due to COVID-19.
2019. Yoonhee Lee. University of Toronto. "Towards universal access to knowledge: the invisible labor of digitizing."
2018. Alessandra Seiter. Simmons College. “Libraries, Power, and Justice: Toward a Sociohistorically Informed Intellectual Freedom.”
2017. Matthew Weirick Johnson. University of North Carolina at Chapel Hill. “Personal Health Data, Surveillance, & Biopolitics: Toward a Personal Health Data Information Literacy.”
2016. Sarah Kortemeier. University of Arizona. “I'll Drown My Book: Visibility, Gender, and Classification in The University of Arizona Poetry Center Library.” 
2015. Kyle Shockey. Indiana University. “Intellectual Freedom Is Not Social Justice: The Symbolic Capital of Intellectual Freedom in ALA Accreditation and LIS Curricula.”
2014. Denise Scott. University of Toronto. “Deconstructing the ‘Books for Boys’ Discourse.”
2013. Emily Lawrence. iSchool at University of Maryland - College Park. “Loud Hands in the Library: Neurodiversity in LIS Theory & Practice."
2012. Sara Zettervall. St. Catherine University. “Through a Distant Lens: Visions of Native Hawaiians in Children’s Picture Books."
2011. Tiffany Chow. University of Michigan. "Design Implications: How Space Can Transform the Library and Its Public."
2010. Kristen Hogan. University of Texas, Austin. "'Breaking Secrets' in the Catalog: Proposing the Black Queer Studies Collection at the University of Texas at Austin."
2009. Sarah Clark. University of California, Los Angeles. “Marketing the Library? Why Librarians Should Focus on Stewardship and Advocacy.” 
2008. Miriam Rigby. University of Washington. "JUST THROW IT ALL AWAY! (and other thoughts I have had that may bar me from a career in archiving)."
2007. Marcel A. Q. LaFlamme. Simmons College. "Towards a Progressive Discourse on Community Needs Assessment: perspectives from collaborative ethnography and action research."
2006. Joseph Deodato. University of Maryland. "Becoming Responsible Mediators: The Application of Postmodern Perspectives to Archival Arrangement and Description.”
2005. Jennifer Downey. San Jose State University. "Public Library Collection Development Issues Regarding the Information Needs of Gay, Lesbian, Bisexual, and Transgender Patrons." 
2004. Prize not given.
2003. Michelle Sipley. Syracuse University. "Operation Patriot Act: The Role of School Libraries in Promoting a Free and Informed Society."

External links
 Progressive Librarian journal.

References

Awards established in 2003
Library science awards
Student awards
Awards for scholarly publications
American librarianship and human rights